This is a list of Georgia Southern Eagles football players in the NFL Draft.

Key

Selections

References

Georgia Southern

Georgia Southern Eagles NFL Draft